808 Mafia is an American record production and songwriting team, founded by record producers Southside, TM88, and Lex Luger. Southside is currently at the helm of the group. The group also includes producers Young Miami , Fuse 100, Tarentino, Purps, Swede, Nonstop Da Hitman, MP808, among others. Its name comes from the drum machine commonly used in hip-hop music, the Roland TR-808.

History 
808 Mafia was founded in 2010 when rapper Waka Flocka Flame came up with the idea of a production team, made of his frequent collaborators Lex Luger and Southside. The group quickly expanded, adding a number of upcoming and affiliated producers, and is currently signed to Flame's label Brick Squad Monopoly. In addition to Waka Flocka Flame, 808 Mafia has produced tracks for many notable artists such as Gucci Mane, Future, Drake, G Herbo, 21 Savage, Chief Keef, Young Thug, Fredo Santana, Juicy J, DJ Khaled, Wiz Khalifa and Cal Scruby among others. Its members have also independently worked on songs with Imran Khan, Kanye West, Rae Sremmurd, Jay-Z, G Eazy, Jeezy, Wale, Pusha T, and DJ Drama.

The group released its debut self-titled instrumental mixtape in 2012, hosted by Trap-A-Holics. The mixtape was produced by and served as an introduction to 5 of its members: TM88 (credited as Trackman), Be-Bop, Purps, Bobby Beats, and Tarentino. A sequel called 808 Mafia II was announced for release on December 21, 2012, but the release was delayed multiple times. In March 2013, a trailer for the tape was released to the team's YouTube channel. 808 Mafia II was released on April 23, 2013, via LiveMixtapes. It was hosted by Trap-A-Holics, DJ Scream and DJ Drama, and features production by Southside, TM88, Purps, Tarentino, Fuse, Chris Fresh, King Trice, OG Taxx and Be Bop.

Members 

 ATL Jacob
 Simple
 Chris Fresh
 DY Krazy
 Fuse
 Gezin
 MaxLord
 Muezly
 MP808
 Nonstop Da Hitman
 Purps
 Pyrex Whippa
 Southside
 Steve Lean
 Tarentino
 TM88
 Tre Pounds
 YK 808
 Henney Major
 YRB
 Kjxrtan
 Sebbikarls
 Daniil3hunna
 Lil 88
Luxury Tax 50
YK
Lukie

Former members 
 Jaye Neutron
 Ken Carson
 Lex Luger
 16yrold
 PVLACE

Discography

Mixtapes

References 

1017 Brick Squad artists
American hip hop record producers
Hip hop collectives
Musical groups established in 2010
Musical groups from Atlanta
Musical groups from Chicago
Record production teams
American songwriting teams
Southern hip hop groups
Record producers from Illinois
2010 establishments in the United States
Trap musicians